Manuel Isidro Orozco Manrique de Lara (1681–1745) was a Spanish bishop who served as Grand Inquisitor of Spain from 1742 to 1745.

Biography

Manuel Isidro Orozco Manrique de Lara was born in Madrid on 15 May 1681.  He was appointed Bishop of Jaén on 21 July 1732 and was consecrated as a bishop by Cardinal Diego de Astorga y Céspedes on 9 October 1732.  He was translated to the Archdiocese of Santiago de Compostela on 5 May 1738.  He became Grand Inquisitor of Spain on 1 January 1742.  He died on 10 January 1745.

References

1681 births
1745 deaths
Grand Inquisitors of Spain
Clergy from Madrid
Bishops of Jaén
Archbishops of Santiago de Compostela
18th-century Roman Catholic archbishops in Spain